Robati Shahzadeh (also Romanized as Robāţī Shāhzādeh) is a village in Taghenkoh-e Shomali Rural District, Taghenkoh District, Firuzeh County, Razavi Khorasan Province, Iran. At the 2006 census, its population was 476, in 122 families.

References 

Populated places in Khoshab County